Otmar Szafnauer (born 13 August 1964) is a Romanian-American engineer. He is currently serving as Team Principal of the BWT Alpine F1 Team.

Biography
Szafnauer was born in Semlac, a small village in Western Romania to an American father of German descent and a Romanian mother.  His family moved to Detroit in the United States when he was seven years old. He received a Bachelor of Science degree in electrical engineering from Wayne State University in Detroit before completing a master's degree in business and finance from the University of Detroit Mercy.

He joined the Ford Motor Company in 1986 and was appointed Programmes Manager for Ford in the United States. While working for Ford, he attended the Jim Russell Racing Driver School and started racing in Formula Ford in 1991. He left Ford in 1998 to become Operations Director at British American Racing in Formula One. After unsuccessful discussions with Jaguar Racing, he was hired by Honda on its return to Formula One in 2001, rising to Vice President of Honda Racing Developments and a member of the Management Board of the Honda F1 team. After leaving Honda in 2008, he founded Soft Pauer which released the official Formula One Timing and Track Positioning Application on the iPhone in June 2009.

Szafnauer joined Force India in October 2009 and played an integral role in the team's improved performance with the team going on an upward path, finishing seventh in 2010 and sixth in 2011, 2013 and 2014 before breaking into the top five in 2015 and achieving the team-best finish of fourth in 2016 and 2017. Szafnauer's efforts also played an instrumental role in the team securing a long-term agreement to use the Mercedes powertrain from the 2014 season onwards.

Szafnauer remained with Force India as they were sold in 2019 and became Aston Martin for the 2021 season, before leaving the team in January 2022. In February 2022, he joined the BWT Alpine F1 Team as team principal.

Awards and recognition

In 2013, Szafnauer was inducted into the USF2000 Hall of Fame in recognition of his racing achievements in motorsport over the last twenty years.

USF2000 results

USAC FF2000 Eastern Division Championship

USAC FF2000 National Championship results

USF2000 National Championship

References

1964 births
Living people
People from Arad County
American people of German descent
American people of Romanian descent
Romanian emigrants to the United States
Romanian motorsport people
Businesspeople from Detroit
University of Detroit Mercy alumni
Formula One team principals
American chief operating officers
U.S. F2000 National Championship drivers
Force India
Aston Martin in Formula One
Racing Point F1 Team